Gary Wells (1957 – 2020) was an American motorcycle daredevil. On September 15, 1980, during a taping of the reality television show That's Incredible! he attempted to jump the fountains at Caesars Palace, a stunt made famous by Evel Knievel's failed attempt, but also crashed and was severely injured.

Gary Wells died in Glendale, Ariz., on August 6, 2020.

References

External links
 http://www.garywells.com - Personal website
 http://www.cyclejumpers.com/garywells.html - Cycle Jumpers - Gary Wells
 https://www.youtube.com/watch?v=DMRZbYcoK1U - Video of the Caesar's Palace jump

1957 births
2020 deaths
American stunt performers